Plexippus fibulatus is a species of jumping spider in the genus Plexippus that lives in Kenya. The male was first described in 2016.

References

Endemic fauna of Kenya
Fauna of Kenya
Salticidae
Spiders of Africa
Spiders described in 2016
Taxa named by Wanda Wesołowska